Micromastus is a genus of true weevils in the beetle family Curculionidae. There is one described species in Micromastus, M. gracilis.

References

Further reading

 
 
 

Molytinae
Articles created by Qbugbot